Tienshanite, named for the Tian Shan Range in Mongolia, is a rare borosilicate mineral, though rock-forming in some parts of its original locality at the Dara-i-Pioz Glacier in  Tajikistan. Its formula is extremely complex: .

References

Borate minerals
Cyclosilicates
Hexagonal minerals
Minerals in space group 175
Borosilicates